Greg Geise (born 3 April 1960) is an Australian cricketer. He played eight first-class and two List A matches for New South Wales between 1983/84 and 1984/85.

See also
 List of New South Wales representative cricketers

References

External links
 

1960 births
Living people
Australian cricketers
New South Wales cricketers
Cricketers from Newcastle, New South Wales